The third season of psychological crime thriller web series Abhay 3 is released on 8 April 2022 on ZEE5.  It consists of 8 episodes, each running approximately 40 to 50 minutes. The season mostly covers about Abhay facing a new unknown threat. The Series is directed by Ken Ghosh and stars Kunal Khemu, Vijay Raaz, Asha Negi, Rahul Dev, Tanuj Virwani, Vidya Malavade, Divya Agarwal, and Nidhi Singh.

Plot 
Abhay faces a new unknown threat, a dark force capable of exploiting anyone in the name of a twisted belief.

Cast 
 Kunal Khemu, as Abhay
 Vijay Raaz, as Mrityu
 Asha Negi, as Sonam
 Rahul Dev, as Avtar
 Tanuj Virwani, as Kabir
 Divya Agarwal, as Harleen
 Nidhi Singh, as Khushboo
 Vidya Malvade, as Nidhi

Reception 
According to Sibal Chatterjee from NDTV " Kunal Khemu Sails Through Gruesome Season With Effortless Ease." Ronak Kotecha from Times of India wrote " A gritty and relentless crime thriller.

Filming/Production

Episodes

References

External Links 
 Abhay Season 3 at IMDb
 Abhay Season 3 at ZEE5

Indian web series
Crime thriller web series